This is a list in alphabetical order of cricketers who played first-class cricket for the Europeans cricket teams, a side which played matches in India. The Europeans cricket teams played first-class cricket from 1892 until 1948, one year after India gained Independence from the United Kingdom. The Europeans were split into two distinct teams: one based in Bombay and which played in the Bombay Quadrangular, and the other based in Madras, which played in the Madras Presidency Matches. In total, the Europeans played in 127 first-class matches, until their first-class status was discontinued after the 1947–48 season.

The details are the player's usual name followed by the years in which he was active as a first-class player for the side and then his name is given as it would appear on modern match scorecards. Note that many players represented other first-class teams besides the Europeans.

A

B

C

D

E
 Frederick Eccleston (1945–46) : F. E. Eccleston
 Geoffrey Edge (1942–43) : G. B. Edge
 Arthur Edwards (1902–03) : A. C. Edwards
 Henry Ellison (1896–97) : H. J. Ellison
 William Enderby (1926–27) : W. Enderby

F

G

H

I
 Charles Inder (1938–39) : C. E. Inder
 Roland Ingram-Johnson (1925/26–1945–46) : R. E. S. Ingram-Johnson
 Tim Inskip (1926–27) : R. D. Inskip
 de Courcy Ireland (1897–98) : d. Ireland

J
 Malcolm Jardine (1894/95–1902–03) : M. R. Jardine
 Henry John (1893/94–1903–04) : H. C. R. John
 Charles Johnson (1893–94) : C. D. Johnson
 P. Johnson (1924–25)
 Conrad Johnstone (1925/26–1947–48) : C. P. Johnstone
 Frank Joy (1908–09) : F. D. H. Joy
 Ronald Joy (1929–30) : R. C. G. Joy
 Peter Judge (1944/45–1945–46) : P. F. Jugde

K

L

M

N
 Ren Nailer (1922/23–1944–45) : R. S. Nailer
 Guy Napier (1909–10) : G. G. Napier
 Arthur Newnham (1892/93–1898–99) : A. T. H. Newnham
 William Newsam (1915/16–1932/33) : W. O. Newsam

O
 L. O'Callaghan (1940–41)
 S. Oliver (1916–17)
 Gordon Orford (G. A. Orford) (1943–44)
 Montague Ormsby (1919–20) : M. H. Ormsby
 Charles Orton (1938–39) : C. T. Orton

P

R

S

T

U
 Cecil U'ren (1941/42–1943/44) : C. W. E. U'Ren
 Thomas Usborne (1892/93–1899/00) : T. M. Usborne

V
 Paul van der Gucht (1935/36–1936–37) : P. I. van der Gucht
 William van Someren (1910–11) : W. W. van Someren
 Gerge Vasey (1917/18–1918–19) : G. H. Vasey
 J. S. Versey-Brown (1939/40–1942–43)
 A. Vezey (1925–36)
 Walter Vezey (1925–26) : W. J. Vezey
 Raymond Vine (1945–46) : R. J. J. Vine
 Duncan Vines (1897/98–1908–09) : D. F. Vines

W

Y
 James Yates (1911/12–1923–24) : J. A. Yates
 Ronald Yeldham (1924/25–1927–28) : R. E. S. Yeldham

Notes

References

Lists of first-class cricketers
Lists of Indian cricketers